Rodman is a city in Palo Alto County, Iowa, United States. The population was 31 at the time of the 2020 census. Rodman is also the farthest city in Iowa from any National park, being 372 miles away from the closest National park in the United States.

History
Rodman got its start in the early 1880s, following construction of the Burlington, Cedar Rapids and Northern Railway through that territory. It was named for one Mr. Rodman, a retired sailor, who owned the town site.

Geography
Rodman is located at  (43.026874, -94.527795).

Demographics

2010 census
As of the census of 2010, there were 45 people, 23 households, and 12 families living in the city. The racial makeup of the city was 100.0% White.

There were 23 households, of which 21.7% had children under the age of 18 living with them, 39.1% were married couples living together, 4.3% had a female householder with no husband present, 8.7% had a male householder with no wife present, and 47.8% were non-families. 43.5% of all households were made up of individuals, and 8.6% had someone living alone who was 65 years of age or older. The average household size was 1.96 and the average family size was 2.50.

The median age in the city was 50.5 years. 15.6% of residents were under the age of 18; 2.2% were between the ages of 18 and 24; 13.3% were from 25 to 44; 51.1% were from 45 to 64; and 17.8% were 65 years of age or older. The gender makeup of the city was 51.1% male and 48.9% female.

2000 census
As of the census of 2000, there were 56 people, 24 households, and 16 families living in the city. The racial makeup of the city was 96.43% White, 3.57% from other races.

There were 24 households, out of which 33.3% had children under the age of 18 living with them, 45.8% were married couples living together, 8.3% had a female householder with no husband present, and 33.3% were non-families. 33.3% of all households were made up of individuals, and 12.5% had someone living alone who was 65 years of age or older. The average household size was 2.33 and the average family size was 2.94.

In the city, the population was spread out, with 25.0% under the age of 18, 7.1% from 18 to 24, 25.0% from 25 to 44, 32.1% from 45 to 64, and 10.7% who were 65 years of age or older. The median age was 40 years. For every 100 females, there were 100.0 males. For every 100 females age 18 and over, there were 100.0 males.

The median income for a household in the city was $29,063, and the median income for a family was $31,250. Males had a median income of $28,438 versus $16,250 for females. The per capita income for the city was $15,347. None of the population and none of the families were below the poverty line.

Education 
It is within the West Bend–Mallard Community School District. It was established on July 1, 1995, by the merger of the West Bend and Mallard school districts.

References

Cities in Palo Alto County, Iowa
Cities in Iowa